Cottone is a surname of Italian origin. Notable people with this surname include:

 Antonio Cottone (1904/1905–1956), Italian member of the Sicilian Mafia
 Benedetto Cottone (1917–2018), Italian politician
 Carlo Cottone, prince of Castelnuovo, (1756–1829), Italian politician, advocate of the Sicilian Constitution of 1812
 Jay Cottone (born 1949), American football player
 Maegan Cottone, British American songwriter, singer, vocal producer and vocal arranger
 Robert Rocco Cottone (born 1952), American psychologist, ethicist, counselor, poet, and professor

See also 
 Cotton (surname)

Italian-language surnames